Aldaniti (25 June 1970 - 28 March 1997) was a racehorse who won the Grand National on 4 April 1981. His jockey on that day, Bob Champion, had recovered from cancer, while Aldaniti had recovered after suffering a career-threatening injury. The horse was trained by Josh Gifford.

Aldaniti starred as himself in the 1983 film Champions alongside John Hurt. His Grand National win was voted 61st of the 100 Greatest Sporting Moments in a Channel 4 opinion poll.

Background
Aldaniti was a chestnut gelding bred in the United Kingdom by Harrowgate Stud. His name was derived from the names of his breeder Tommy Barron's four grandchildren: Alastair, David, Nicola, Timothy. During his racing career he was owned by Nick Embiricos from Kirdford, West Sussex, and trained by Josh Gifford at Findon.

Racing career
Aldaniti emerged as a top-class steeplechaser in the 1978/79 National Hunt season. He finished third in the 1979 Cheltenham Gold Cup and second in the Scottish Grand National. He sustained a serious leg injury at Sandown in November 1979 and was off the racecourse for over a year.

He returned in 1981 with the Grand National as his target and established himself as a legitimate contender with a win in the Whitbread Trial Chase at Ascot in February. At Aintree the gelding was assigned a weight of 153 pounds, and started the 10/1 second favourite behind Spartan Missile, a dual winner of the Fox Hunters' Chase. Aldaniti took the lead at the eleventh fence and maintained his advantage for the rest of the race, fighting off a late challenge from Spartan Missile on the run-in to win by four lengths. The next day, more than 3,000 people turned out to welcome the horse back to his stable at Findon.

Aldaniti also ran in the 1982 Grand National with Bob Champion, but fell at the first fence.

Retirement
Aldaniti was retired from racing in 1982 and spent the remainder of his life at his owner's farm in Sussex. He died of old age in March 1997.

A British Rail Class 86 electric locomotive was named after him.

Grand National record

Pedigree

References

1970 racehorse births
1997 racehorse deaths
National Hunt racehorses
Grand National winners
Racehorses trained in the United Kingdom
Racehorses bred in the United Kingdom
Thoroughbred family 8-k